Gateways High School is a public high school of choice in downtown Springfield, Oregon, United States.

Academics
In 2008, 55% of the school's seniors received their high school diploma. Of 49 students, 27 graduated, 15 dropped out, and 7 are still in high school.

References

High schools in Lane County, Oregon
Springfield, Oregon
Public high schools in Oregon